The Audibles is a pop and hip hop production duo from Las Vegas, Nevada, consisting of  Dominic "DJ Mecca" Jordan and Jimmy "Jimmy G" Giannos. They originally met in 2007 at the “Lost in Love”  music video shoot for Polow Da Don artists I-15 at the Palms Casino in Paradise, Nevada. They coined their name “The Audibles” from its root definition “to be heard” and “to change the game,” as seen by quarterbacks in football. JR Castro and Das offered an opportunity for the two to move to Atlanta and develop their art further under producer Polow Da Don.

Career

Rise to success
Their first major production by The Audibles came with Interscope recording artist Mishon’s “Turn it Up” in 2009. It featured Roscoe Dash. The song reached #80 on the  Billboard Hot 100 and attained widespread attention for the first time. They also co-produced Young Money's 3rd single “Girl I Got You” with Mr. Pyro on YMCMB’s first album entitled “We Are Young Money. Through their partnership with Jason “Poo Bear” Boyd, the duo went on to create records for Redman, Reggie, and landed an instant cult hip hop classic entitled “Lite 1 Witcha Boi” featuring Method Man and Bun B.

Recent history
In 2012, they worked with Lupe Fiasco on his newest single “Bitch Bad” for his forthcoming album, “Lupe Fiasco's Food & Liquor II: The Great American Rap Album Pt. 1.”  The two teamed up with Poo Bear to work on his R&B opus “BEATS 2 BREAK UP 2″ which they did almost all the production for, aside from “Made You Break Up With Me” produced by Mr. Pyro. They have produced songs for artists like Keyshia Cole, Chris Brown,  YMCMB, Fabolous and Usher. They are currently working on songs for  Justin Bieber, Kanye West, Trey Songz, Drake, and Rihanna.

In 2013, they worked with French Montana and were in the studio with pop superstar Justin Bieber to produce six records off of his journal album. Bad Day, Recovery, PYD, Swap It Out, Alone, and Hold Tight were all released as singles. Journals (album) was noted by critics as well as fans as one of the greatest R&B albums of this generation.

In 2014, the guys took some time off to travel the world and do some humanitarian work. They released a record entitled "Julius Ceasar" with the artist French Montana, which gained great success. They also produced five songs on the Multi-Grammy award-winning and singer/songwriter Poo Bear's BEATS 2 MAKE LOVE 2. The EP trumped all of the R&B albums released that year with grammy suggestions from critics.

In 2015, The Audibles got back in the studio and worked on several songs with Justin Bieber and Poo Bear for his fourth album Purpose (Justin Bieber album). Out of the songs, "No Pressure" was released feat. Big Sean. They also contributed to Chris Brown's seventh studio album Royalty by producing the song "Little More (Royalty)," for which the music video was released on December 18, 2015. They teamed back up with their childhood friend JR Castro to work on his debut EP and Co-produced a single with DJ Mustard entitled "Get Home" feat. Kid Ink and Quavo.

In 2016, the group was already in the studio producing for Grammy award-winning artist Mary J. Blige and other A-List artists like Trey Songz and Mike Posner.  After having the 2015 R&B record of the year “Get Home,” their best friend and artist JR Castro expected to follow up with a summer smash entitled “Right Away,” produced by The Audibles. Even though they've recently received their first Triple Platinum Plaque for the “No Pressure” record off Justin Bieber's forthcoming album Purpose, the guys have not stopped grinding in the studio.  The duo is currently working on projects in hopes of working with the country legends Rascal Flatts and Stevie Wonder.  The Audibles have made their mark on the music industry, and they are just getting started.  They are determined to “Be Heard and Change The Game."

In 2017 it was a promising year for the two. The Audibles were up for album of the year at the Grammys for Justin Bieber Purpose. They also produce a record entitled “Famous” on Ty Dolla Sign Album Beach House 3. Sam Smith is another artist The Audibles had the pleasure to work with. They wrote a song called “Burning” on The Thrill of It All (Sam Smith album) that was released later that year. Common Kings released their debut album “Lost In Paradise,” which was produced in nearly its entirety by The Audibles. They've also been working hard on their artist LAZR's album to be released in summer 2018.

In 2018, DJ and Jimmy started with another Grammy Nomination for Best Reggae Album with the Common Kings. They are currently working on new records with current artists and released LAZR debut single entitled “Schemin” in February.

New Decade
In 2020, The Audibles had an eventful year. In January, The guys teamed back up with one of their long-time collaborators Justin Bieber on his fifth studio album entitled Changes. They produced four records on the album; Intentions feat. Quavo, Come Around Me, Running Over Feat. Lil Dicky, and Second Emotion feat. Travis Scott. Intentions went on to be Justin's second single received raving reviews. The song stayed top 10 on Billboard Hot 100 for 22 weeks, peaking at number one on Billboard radio charts Mainstream Top 40. In March 2020, Variety (magazine) labeled them the "Hitmaker Of The Month" for their work on Changes album. They also Executive Produced LAZR's debut album "BLAWSOME" with Phil Ivey, Illya Trencher, and Chris Gotti. They produced all records on the album except one, "Seattle." Although every song on the project stands on its own, "Bestfriend" became of the few favorites because of its signature "Audible's Sound" mix with LAZR's infectious top line.

Although COVID-19 drastically slowed the music industry down, The Audibles pivoted into releasing their own music. "Do Cool Sh!t With Your Friends" is the title/ mood of their debut album that sums up "the sound." "UP" Feat. Poo Bear became their first release under their new distribution company NOTOMORO. The record was an indie success and a great introduction to where the guys envision what their own sonics consists of. Their second single, "SOON AS I," Feat. Sab Story P/K/A STORY was released Oct. 20, 2020, and became heavy rotation material for the club DJs. They went in their bag a third time for their next single "OUTRAGEOUS" Feat. Sebastian Reynoso. Late 2020, They collaborated with Chris Brown and Young Thug for their third single on their joint project Slime and B entitled "City Girls."

In 2021, The Guys have been extremely focusing on breaking new and incredible talents. LAZR, Sebastian Reynoso, Samantha Free, and Savannah Bleu, to name a few. They've also been focused on branding their new Music Distribution platform, "NOTOMORO," which helps up and coming stars aggregate and release their music to all streaming platforms.

References

External links
Official Website
 
 
 
 
 
 
 
 

American hip hop record producers
Musical groups established in 2007
Southern hip hop groups
American musical duos
Hip hop duos
Record production duos
Musical groups from the Las Vegas Valley
Year of birth missing (living people)
Living people
American songwriting teams